Knowland is a surname. Notable people with the surname include:

George Arthur Knowland VC (1922–1945), English recipient of the Victoria Cross during the Second World War
Joe Knowland (1930–2019), actor from Oakland, California
Joseph Knowland (1833–1912), father of U.S. Representative Joseph Russell Knowland, grandfather of U.S. Senator William Fife Knowland
Joseph R. Knowland (1873–1966), American politician and newspaper publisher
Tony Knowland (1919–2006), professor of English literature
William F. Knowland (1908–1974), United States politician, newspaperman, and Republican Party leader

See also
Joseph Knowland State Arboretum and Park, park located in Oakland, California